Iryna Onufriyivna Kalynets (6 December 1940, Lviv – 31 July 2012, Lviv) was a Ukrainian poet, writer, activist and Soviet dissident during the 1970s. Kalynets was the wife of another leading Soviet dissident, Ihor Kalynets.

Biography
Kalynets graduated from Lviv University with a degree in philology and taught courses in Ukrainian literature and language. She associated with the "shistedesyatnyky" or Sixtiers and published a banned human rights journal, "Український Вісник." She also publicly protested the detention of other dissidents, including Nina Strokata and Valentyn Moroz. Kalynets and two other activists, Nadiya Svitlychna and Stefania Shabatura, were arrested for a writing on Soviet propaganda. She was sentenced to six years in prison and three years of internal exile within the Soviet Union.

Kalynets was able to return to Lviv in 1981 following the completion of her sentence. A proponent of the Ukrainian independence movement, she soon joined Memorial and Rukh, a pair of civil rights organizations.

Ukraine broke away from the Soviet Union in 1991. Kalynets was elected to the Verkhovna Rada as a deputy in Ukraine's first post independence parliament. She continued to publish writings until her health deteriorated.

Iryna Kalynets died from a long illness on 31 July 2012, at the age of 71.

References

1940 births
2012 deaths
University of Lviv alumni
Ukrainian women poets
Soviet dissidents
Soviet prisoners and detainees
Ukrainian dissidents
Academic staff of Lviv Polytechnic
First convocation members of the Verkhovna Rada
20th-century Ukrainian poets
20th-century Ukrainian women writers
Burials at Lychakiv Cemetery
Recipients of the Order of Princess Olga, 3rd class
20th-century Ukrainian women politicians
20th-century Ukrainian politicians
Women members of the Verkhovna Rada